Arab Mexicans are Mexican citizens of Arab ethnic, cultural and linguistic heritage or identity, who identify themselves as Arab. Some of Mexico's Arabs are of Lebanese, or Palestinian descent.

The inter-ethnic marriage in the Arab community, regardless of religious affiliation, is very high; most community members have only one parent who has Arab ethnicity. As a result of this, the  Arab community in Mexico shows marked language shift away from only Arabic. Only a few speak any mainly Arabic, and such knowledge is often limited to a few basic words. Instead the majority, especially those of younger generations, speak Spanish as a first language. Arabic and Spanish have collided in Mexico as a mixture of languages and put into one which is spoken more than the original Arabic. An example of this intercultural exchange is present in the hit television program Hecho en Mexico and especially in popular character Roby Checa’s day-to-day interactions. His popular Pedas de Rancho series is an example of his contribution to Mexican Arab culture and is currently being debated in the Mexican Senate floor for the honorary admission to the Archivos Nacionales.

Migration history

Arab immigration to Mexico started in the 19th and early 20th centuries. Roughly 100,000 Arabic speakers settled in Mexico during this time period. They came mostly from Lebanon and Syria, and settled in significant numbers in Nayarit, Guanajuato, Puebla, Mexico City and the Northern part of the country (mainly in the states of Baja California, Tamaulipas, Nuevo Leon, San Luis Potosí, Sonora, Sinaloa, Chihuahua, Zacatecas, Coahuila and Durango), as well as the cities of Tampico and Guadalajara. They also came for slave trade in the 18th century. The term "Arab Mexican" may include ethnic groups that do not in fact identify as Arab.

During the Israel–Lebanon war in 1948 and during the Six-Day War, thousands of Lebanese went to Mexico. They first arrived in Veracruz. Although Arabs made up less than 5% of the total immigrant population in Mexico during the 1930s, they constituted half of the immigrant economic activity.

Migration of Arabs to Mexico has influenced Mexican culture, in particular food, where they have introduced Kibbeh, Tabbouleh and even created recipes such as Tacos Árabes. By 1765, dates, which originated from the Middle East, were introduced into Mexico by the Spaniards. The fusion between Arab and Mexican food has highly influenced Yucatecan cuisine.

Another concentration of Arab Mexicans is in Baja California facing the U.S.-Mexican border, esp. in cities of Mexicali in the Imperial Valley U.S./Mexico and Tijuana across from San Diego with a large Arab American community (about 280,000), some of whose families have relatives in Mexico. 45% of Arab Mexicans are of Lebanese descent.

The majority of Arab Mexicans are Christians who belong to the Maronite Church, Roman Catholic, Eastern Orthodox and Eastern Rite Catholic Churches. A scant number are Muslims of Middle Eastern origins.

Figures

Notable people

María Fassi, professional golfer of Moroccan descent from Pachuca
Carlos Slim, business magnate, investor, and philanthropist. Formerly the richest man in the world. Slim's parents are both Mexicans of Lebanese Maronite Catholic descent.
Salma Hayek, actress; she is half Lebanese via her father.
Emeraude Toubia, actress and model raised in Brownsville, Texas, half Lebanese via her father and half Mexican via her mother.
José Antonio Meade Kuribreña, economist, lawyer and diplomat and former Mexican Secretariat of Foreign Affairs of Lebanese and British descent.
Pedro Joaquín Coldwell, politician affiliated to the Institutional Revolutionary Party (PRI) of Lebanese and English descent.
Emilio Chuayffet, lawyer and politician, the incumbent Secretary of Public Education of Mexico of Lebanese descent.
Antonio Badú, actor and singer
Enrique Dau, former mayor of Guadalajara, grandson of the Lebanese emigrant Wadih Dau
José Murat Casab, former Governor of Oaxaca and a member of the Institutional Revolutionary Party of Iraqi descent.
Alfredo Harp Helú, Mexican businessman of Lebanese origin.
Pépé Abed, Lebanese-born Mexican jeweler returned to Lebanon after 40 years.
Victor Nacif, Vice President of Design Business Aspects for Nissan Design America, of Iraqi descent.
Mauricio Féres Yázbek (Garcés), actor of Lebanese descent from Tampico, Tamaulipas
Alfonso Petersen Farah, mayor of Guadalajara. German, Danish and Lebanese descent.
Emilio Hassan, footballer, nephew of Carlos Slim, of Lebanese descent.
Paul Ham, bassist for Anabantha, of Lebanese descent.
Ricardo Dájer Nahum, Mexican politician of Lebanese origin.
Jeff Becerra, Heavy metal musician of Lebanese descent.
Capulina, actor of Lebanese descent.
Jaime Camil, Actor, singer of Egyptian and Brazilian descent.
Isaac Saba Raffoul, businessman of Syrian descent.
Astrid Hadad, Mexican actress of Lebanese descent.
Miguel Sabah, a Mexican international footballer of mixed Palestinian/Mexican/Lebanese descent
Liliana Abud, an actress in telenovelas and Mexican cinema.
José Sulaimán, President of the World Boxing Council, Lebanese descent.
Antonio Mohamed, Argentine-born Mexican soccer player of Lebanese descent.
Samer Omar, football player currently playing for Tiburones Rojos de Veracruz. He is of Lebanese background.
Kamel Nacif Borge, Mexican businessman of Lebanese descent.
Jesús Murillo Karam, Mexican politician of Lebanese descent.
Susana Harp, Mexican singer of traditional music of Lebanese and Mexican descent.
Omar Fayad, Mexican politician of Lebanese descent.
Rosemary Barkett, U.S. Federal Judge to Syrian parent.
Jorge Kahwagi, Mexican boxer, lawyer, businessman, and politician of Lebanese descent.
Carlos Jiménez Mabarak, Musician of Lebanese descent.
Ikram Antaki, Mexican writer of Syrian origin.
Arturo Elías Ayub, Mexican businessman of Lebanese descent.
Alfredo Elias Ayub, Director General of Federal Electricity Commission, Arturo Elías Ayub is his youngest brother, of Lebanese descent.
Bibelot Mansur, actress born to a Mexican mother and a father of Lebanese descent.
Miguel Layún, a Mexican international footballer of Lebanese and Spanish descent.
Jerónimo Amione, a Mexican footballer of Lebanese and Mexican descent.
Gibrán Lajud, a Mexican footballer of Lebanese and Mexican descent.
Jaime Sabines, a Mexican poet of Lebanese descent.
Alejandro Bichir, a Mexican actor of Lebanese and Mexican descent.
Bruno Bichir, a Mexican actor of Lebanese and Mexican descent.
Demián Bichir, a Mexican actor of Lebanese and Mexican descent.
Odiseo Bichir, a Mexican actor of Lebanese and Mexican descent.
Jorge Estefan Chidiac, Mexican politician of Lebanese descent
María de Lourdes Dieck-Assad, Mexican economist of Belgian and Levantine descent.
Zidane Zeraoui El Awad, Mexican professor and researcher of Algerian origin.
Giselle Zarur, Mexican sports journalist and television reporter of part-Lebanese descent

See also

 Arab diaspora
 Immigration to Mexico
 Arab Argentines
 Arab Brazilians
 Arab Colombians
 Lebanese diaspora
 Syrian diaspora
 Palestinian diaspora

External links
 Arab Mexican Chamber of Industry and Commerce
  Los árabes de México. Asimilación y Herencia Cultural

References

 
Ethnic groups in Mexico
Arab groups